This is a record of Jamaica's results at the FIFA World Cup. The FIFA World Cup, sometimes called the Football World Cup or the Soccer World Cup, but usually referred to simply as the World Cup, is an international association football competition contested by the men's national teams of the members of Fédération Internationale de Football Association (FIFA), the sport's global governing body. The championship has been awarded every four years since the first tournament in 1930, except in 1942 and 1946, due to World War II.

The tournament consists of two parts, the qualification phase and the final phase (officially called the World Cup Finals). The qualification phase, which currently take place over the three years preceding the Finals, is used to determine which teams qualify for the Finals. The current format of the Finals involves 32 teams competing for the title, at venues within the host nation (or nations) over a period of about a month. The World Cup Finals is the most widely viewed sporting event in the world, with an estimated 715.1 million people watching the 2006 tournament final.

Jamaica has qualified for the finals of the FIFA World Cup once with it happening in 1998 after they finished third in the final round of CONCACAF qualifying. Although they beat Japan 2–1 in their third and final group game, two earlier defeats meant they failed to progress to the Round of 16.

Overview

1998 FIFA World Cup
In 1996, the Jamaican Football Federation hired Brazilian René Simões to take charge of the team. After comfortably getting through the second round, they finish top of their group in the third round to qualify through to the hexagon where the top three qualified through to the finals. A slow start in the finals saw the national team winless from the first four games of the final round. But 1–0 wins against El Salvador, Canada and Costa Rica gave the national team some hope with Deon Burton scoring the winning goal in two of those matches. After a 0–0 draw against Mexico, Jamaica secured their qualification with a 2–2 draw against El Salvador to make their first (and to date only) appearance at a World Cup with the following day being declared a national holiday.

Squad
Head coach:  Renê Simões

Group H table

Jamaica vs. Croatia

Argentina vs Jamaica

Japan vs Jamaica

Record players

Nine players have been fielded in all three of Jamaica's FIFA World Cup matches, making them record World Cup players for their country:

Top goalscorers

The two goals scored by Theodore Whitmore during Jamaica's only World Cup win, their 2–1 over Japan, make him Jamaica's record scorer at World Cup tournaments.

References

 
Countries at the FIFA World Cup